Pterhemia is a genus of moths of the family Erebidae. The genus was erected by Achille Guenée in 1854.

Species
Pterhemia ameriola Druce, 1890 Panama
Pterhemia exscissa Schaus, 1913 Costa Rica
Pterhemia monogramma Hampson, 1926 Venezuela
Pterhemia mutilatalis Guenée, 1854 Brazil (Pará), French Guiana
Pterhemia schausialis Dognin, 1914 Ecuador
Pterhemia uncinalis (Geyer, 832) West Indies, Brazil (Rio de Janeiro)

References

Calpinae